The 1999-00 Bulgarian Hockey League season was the 48th season of the Bulgarian Hockey League, the top level of ice hockey in Bulgaria. Five teams participated in the league, and HK Slavia Sofia won the championship.

Standings

External links
 Season on hockeyarchives.info

Bulgar
Bulgarian Hockey League seasons
Bulg